There are 103 sites on the National Register of Historic Places listings in South Side Chicago — of more than 350 total listings within the City of Chicago, in Cook County, Illinois.

The South Side district is defined for this article as the area west of Lake Michigan, and south of 26th Street and the Chicago Sanitary and Ship Canal, to the southern Chicago city limits.

South Side Chicago listings on the National Register
The listed properties are distributed across 19 of the 77 well-defined community areas of Chicago.

|}

Former listing

|}

See also

List of Chicago Landmarks

National Register of Historic Places listings in Central Chicago
National Register of Historic Places listings in North Side Chicago
National Register of Historic Places listings in West Side Chicago
List of Registered Historic Places in Illinois
List of National Historic Landmarks in Illinois

References

External links
Chicago Listing on the National Register of Historic Places, August 5, 2011, City of Chicago, Rahm Emanuel, Mayor.
NPS Focus database, National Park Service.

South Side, Chicago
South
Chicago-related lists